The Canon EOS 650D, known as the Kiss X6i in Japan or the Rebel T4i in America, is an 18.0 megapixels digital single-lens reflex camera (DSLR), announced by Canon on 8 June 2012. It is the successor of the EOS 600D/Kiss X5/Rebel T3i and is the predecessor of the EOS 700D/Kiss X7i/Rebel T5i. Sales began on 15 June 2012. At introduction, recommended retail prices for the body were US$849.99, £699.99 (including VAT), and €839.99 (including VAT).

Features
The 650D is the first Canon DSLR that has continuous autofocus in video mode and live view, which Canon calls "Hybrid CMOS AF". This feature, intended mainly for video recording, is implemented through a new sensor technology in which certain pixels are dedicated to phase-detection AF (traditionally used in DSLRs) and others to contrast-detection AF (used in camcorders). When the subject is in the center of the frame, phase detection is used to identify the subject's current location, with contrast detection then used to fine-tune the focus. Hybrid CMOS AF will be available with all lenses, but other improvements to video autofocus, specifically in smoothness and quietness, will depend on the use of Canon's new STM lenses, two of which were announced alongside the 650D. DPReview noted that the Hybrid CMOS AF system was similar to the focusing system of the Nikon 1 mirrorless cameras.

The 650D is also the first DSLR from any manufacturer equipped with a touchscreen, although it is not the first interchangeable-lens camera with this feature. Almost all shooting parameters and camera functions can be controlled either via the touchscreen, or by buttons and the control dial.

The AF system used for stills shooting through the optical viewfinder is inherited from the EOS 60D. All 9 points are cross-type, as opposed to only the central point in the 600D. The central point is also dual cross-type (i.e., also sensitive to diagonal lines) at 2.8. The EOS 650D is built with two new shooting modes designed for inexperienced photographers: the Handheld Night Scene mode and the HDR backlight mode. The Handheld Night Scene mode reduces the risk of blur while taking nighttime shots without a tripod while the HDR backlight mode uses Canon's patented multishot system to combine three images into one, balancing both foreground and background exposure.

Feature list

 18.0 megapixel APS-C CMOS sensor
 DIGIC 5 image processor with 14-bit processing
 95% viewfinder frame coverage with 0.85x magnification
 1080p HD video recording at 24p, 25p (25 Hz) and 30p (29.97 Hz) with drop frame timing
 720p HD video recording at 50p (50 Hz) and 60p (59.94 Hz)
 480p ED video recording at 50p (50 Hz) and 60p (59.94 Hz)
 5.0 frames per second continuous shooting
 ISO sensitivity 100 – 12800 (expandable to H: 25600)
 3.0" Clear View II vari-angle LCD touchscreen with 1.040.000 dots resolution
 9 points AF system, all cross-type at f/5.6. Center point is high precision, double cross-type at f/2.8
 63-zone color sensitive metering system
 Built-in Speedlite transmitter
 The camera is compatible with Canon's latest radio-controlled flashes, but the built-in transmitter is infrared-only.
 Built-in stereo microphone
 3.5mm microphone jack for external microphones or recorders

One feature of the 600D missing from the 650D is the former's 3-10x digital zoom capability when shooting 1080p video.

Ergonomics

The 650D has roughly the same dimensions as the 600D, and apart from the touchscreen has largely the same physical controls as previous models. One notable difference is that the two-position power switch of the 600D is replaced with a three-position switch on the 650D, with the added position used to activate the video shooting mode.

Speed
The DIGIC 5 processor, used for the first time in a consumer-level Canon DSLR, allows for a significant increase in continuous shooting from the 600D of 5.0 frames per second, up from 3.7 frames per second. The 650D is also the first Canon DSLR to support the UHS-I bus . The 650D's autofocus during live view mode is approximately two times faster than the 600D.

References

External links

650D
Live-preview digital cameras
Cameras introduced in 2012